Timothy Noor Ouma (born 10 June 2004) is a Kenyan attacking midfielder currently playing for Swedish top-tier side IF Elfsborg and the Kenya national team.

Career 
He joined the club in July 2020  from Laiser Hill Academy on an initial three-year deal and extended the same for another two years  to June 2025 in September 2021 after a stellar 2020-21 Kenyan Premier League season.

Timothy was handed his Kenyan Premier League debut on 29 Nov 2020 by head coach Sanjin Alagic after being introduced in the 83rd minute in a season opener against Nzoia Sugar in Narok.

He scored his debut premier goal in the opening game of 2021/22 Premier league season against Sofapaka in Wundanyi. He went on to score in the next two games against Kenya Police and Wazito.

He added four more goals against Kakamega Homeboyz, Bandari, AFC Leopards, and Gor Mahia to end the season with seven goals.

In mid-July 2022 he was signed up by IF Elfsborg. He joined the club a month later after his official transfer from Nairobi City Stars.

National team 
In late October 2021, Babu received a Kenya national football team call up  from head coach Engin Firat for two final World Cup qualifier against Uganda  and Rwanda.

Babu made his debut for Kenya on 11 November 2021 in a World Cup qualifier against Uganda after coming on as a 72nd minute substitute. He earned his second cap  four days later on 15 November 2021 in a World Cup qualifier against Rwanda after being introduced in the 80th minute.

References

External links
 
 

Living people
2004 births
Kenyan footballers
Kenya international footballers
Association football midfielders
Nairobi City Stars players
Kenyan Premier League players